FRUA or Frua may refer to:

 AC Frua, a British GT built by AC Cars from 1965 to 1973
 Pietro Frua, Italian coachbuilder and car designer
 Families for Russian and Ukrainian Adoption, a support organization providing international adoption support resources for families completed through adoption in 32 Eastern European and Central Asian countries
 Forgotten Realms: Unlimited Adventures, a video game originally released on March 17, 1993, by Strategic Simulations, Inc.